The 1973–74 Czechoslovak Extraliga season was the 31st season of the Czechoslovak Extraliga, the top level of ice hockey in Czechoslovakia. 12 teams participated in the league, and Dukla Jihlava won the championship.

Regular season

1. Liga-Qualification
 TJ Gottwaldov – ŠK Liptovský Mikuláš 3–1 (9–2, 8–2, 4–5PP, 8–2)
 TJ Gottwaldov won the series 3–1 and qualified to 1974–75 Czechoslovak Extraliga.

External links
History of Czechoslovak ice hockey

Czechoslovak Extraliga seasons
Czechoslovak
1973–74 in Czechoslovak ice hockey